Events from the year 1208 in Ireland.

Incumbent
Lord: John

Events
 The town and lands of Fethard, County Tipperary were lost to its founder, William de Braose, following a dispute he had with King John of England.
 Auliffe O'Rothlain, Chief of Calry of Coolcarney, was slain by O'Moran.

References

 
1200s in Ireland
Ireland
Years of the 13th century in Ireland